Staveley Town is a disused railway station in Staveley,   Derbyshire in  England.

Similarly-named stations

Barrow Hill was the next stop along the line towards  from Staveley Town.

Context
The station was on the circuitous  to Elmton & Creswell line via Clowne and Barlborough  and the equally circuitous Barrow Hill to  via  line. The line to Pleasley was known as the Doe Lea Branch because it followed the River Doe Lea for several miles. The line to Creswell was known as the Clowne branch line.

History
The station opened without ceremony on 1 November 1888, for services along the Clowne branch line. It was initially called Netherthorpe, being in the Netherthorpe area of Staveley. On 25 October 1893, it became Netherthorpe for Staveley Town. It was renamed Staveley Town on 1 June 1900. Services calling at the station increased with the opening of the Doe Lea branch line on 1 September 1890.

The station was situated in a cutting between the Lowgates overbridge and a footbridge from Fan Road to Netherthorpe, both of which survive. It had two opposing platforms with small buildings on each of which no trace remains. There was a further building at street level still survive, with modifications, and is now a private residence. 

Normal passenger traffic over the Doe Lea branch line ceased in 1930 and the route was severed by the closure of Rowthorn Tunnel near Hardwick Hall. Coal traffic nevertheless remained the lifeblood of the line. The station closed to passenger traffic on 5 August 1952. In the 1960s, pits began to be worked out. Ramcroft Colliery near Glapwell closed in 1966, followed by Glapwell Colliery in 1974, after which the line beyond  fell into disuse. The line between Bolsover and Glapwell Colliery was taken out of use as from 31 October 1978. It was eventually lifted later in 1978.

Bolsover and Markham Collieries continued to produce coal in large quantities. That was supplemented by traffic to and from the Coalite and Chemical Works at Bolsover, and Bolsover Castle station remained open for goods until 1 November 1962, and in usable condition for passenger traffic at least until 1981, which led to some remarkable trains, notably by Miners' Welfare specials to distant points, and by specials in connection with the Silver Jubilee of Elizabeth II in 1977, all of which passed through the site of Staveley Town station. The last steam trains to use the line were enthusiasts' specials. On 16 October 1965, a "Last 4F" Midlands Tour ran along the Clowne branch line and to Glapwell, then through the site of Staveley Town. On 1 October 1966, a Railway Correspondence and Travel Society Notts & Yorks railtour passed through and is believed to have been the last.

Normal passenger traffic over the Clowne branch line ceased in 1954. Remarkably, the last train was operated by a brand new diesel multiple unit. These duly passed through the site of Staveley Town.

Occasional freight and light engine movements over the Clowne branch line continued until the 1990s, when an underground fire threatened to undermine the line, compounded by the expensive need to replace the points connecting the branch to what is now known as the Robin Hood Line at Elmton & Creswell. The points were replaced by straight track, as were those at Oxcroft Colliery Junction.  The single track between is largely intact, but heavily overgrown.

Bolsover Colliery closed in 1993 and Markham Colliery closed in 1994, followed by Coalite in 2004, which left no traffic on the Doe Lea branch line.

A temporary reprieve for the line through the site of Staveley Town station was obtained following the closure of Arkwright Colliery in 1988. The Arkwright site was eventually opencasted then landscaped, with startling visual impact. The opencast coal was transported by lorry along the trackbed of the Great Central Main Line north of Arkwright, thence to Oxcroft Disposal Point near Shuttlewood, where it was loaded onto Merry-go-Round trains which ran through Oxcroft Colliery Junction, Seymour Junction, the station site and Hall Lane Junction, to join the ex-MR Chesterfield to Rotherham "Back Line" at Foxlow Junction. That traffic came to a natural end in 2006. On 4 March 2006, the Branch Line Society ran a last train special through the station site to the disposal point boundary.

Possible futures
The line through the station site to Seymour Junction and Oxcroft Disposal Point has been mothballed as there remains the possibility of opencast mining in the area. For example, in 2005, UK Coal expressed interest in extracting c530,000 tons near Mastin Moor. The Doe Lea line South to Bolsover (now known as The Bolsover Branch) has been mothballed because it runs through the new Markham Vale Enterprise Zone at M1 Junction 29A It is hoped that someone will invest in this infrastructure to create a road-rail interchange. The branch beyond Bolsover is now a public bridleway known as The Stockley Trail.

References

Notes

Sources

External links
The station on navigable 1947 O.S. map npe Maps
The station (Netherthorpe) on overlain OS maps National Library of Scotland
The station and line overlain on multiple maps Rail Map Online
The station, line and mileages Railway Codes

Disused railway stations in Derbyshire
Former Midland Railway stations
Railway stations in Great Britain opened in 1888
Railway stations in Great Britain closed in 1952